The South African Railways Class 10A 4-6-2 of 1910 was a steam locomotive from the pre-Union era in Transvaal.

In 1910, the Central South African Railways placed ten Class 10-2  Pacific type steam locomotives in service, of which five were built with and five without superheaters. In 1912, when the five saturated steam locomotives were assimilated into the South African Railways, they were renumbered and designated Class 10A.

Manufacturer

Ten heavy  Pacific type passenger locomotives, designed by Central South African Railways (CSAR) Chief Mechanical Engineer G.G. Elliot and based on the Class 10 design of his predecessor, CSAR Chief Locomotive Superintendent P.A. Hyde, were ordered from the North British Locomotive Company and delivered in 1910. They had plate frames, Belpaire fireboxes and Walschaerts valve gear and were delivered in two variants, with five of them using saturated steam while the rest were superheated. They were all designated Class 10-2 by the CSAR, numbered in the range from 665 to 674, and entered service in March 1910.

Characteristics
The Class 10-2 saturated locomotives were similar to the Class 10, except that their boilers were arranged  further forward and their firebox throats and back plates were sloped instead of being vertical. This modification brought the chimney in line with the cylinders and avoided a "set" in the blastpipe. The cylinders were arranged outside the plate frames. Like the Class 10, the locomotives had  diameter coupled wheels, the largest yet used in South Africa at the time.

The Walschaerts valve gear was controlled by a vertical type of steam reversing engine which was attached to the right-hand side of the boiler, just below the dome. It consisted of a  diameter steam cylinder and a  diameter oil cylinder, fitted with a common piston rod with a crosshead which was machined integral with the piston rod. This crosshead was connected to a lever fitted to the reversing shaft. After 1912, these reversing engines were replaced with Hendrie steam reversers.

While the Class 10 had outside admission valves, the Class 10-2 saturated used inside admission piston valves. Two Trevithick exhaust steam feedwater heaters were mounted on the running boards on either side of the smokebox above the cylinders and a Weir's feedwater pump was mounted on the left-hand side of the firebox. The feedwater heaters and the feedwater pump were removed after a few years since the feedwater heater tubes proved to be troublesome to clean.

A Wakefield mechanical-feed lubricator was arranged on the right-hand side running board and was operated through a lever and crank, actuated from the crosshead. Mechanical lubricators had the advantage that the rate of oil-feed was always proportional to the speed of the engine. This type of oil feed was later superseded for the sight-feed lubricator.

The engines were fitted with the Flaman speed recorder, of which the driving gear was connected to the right trailing crank pin. The records obtained from these indicators were of considerable value when operating fast passenger services. The sand boxes were arranged in front of the leading coupled wheels and fitted with steam sanding gear, which was later found to be an unnecessary refinement for South African conditions.

South African Railways
When the Union of South Africa was established on 31 May 1910, the three Colonial government railways (Cape Government Railways, Natal Government Railways and CSAR) were united under a single administration to control and administer the railways, ports and harbours of the Union. Although the South African Railways and Harbours came into existence in 1910, the actual classification and renumbering of all the rolling stock of the three constituent railways were only implemented with effect from 1 January 1912.

When they were assimilated into the South African Railways (SAR) in 1912, the five saturated steam locomotives, numbered in the CSAR range from 665 to 669, were designated Class 10A and renumbered in the range from 747 to 751. The five superheated locomotives were designated Class 10B.

Watson standard boilers
In the 1930s, many serving locomotives were reboilered with a standard round-topped boiler type, designed by then Chief Mechanical Engineer A.G. Watson as part of his standardisation policy. Such Watson Standard reboilered locomotives were reclassified by adding an "R" suffix to their classification letter.

All five Class 10A locomotives were eventually reboilered with Watson Standard no. 1 boilers. Since the original difference between the Class 10A and Class 10B lay only in the fact that their respective boilers were constructed without or with superheaters, distinction between the two types became unnecessary after this reboilering. The reboilered Class 10A locomotives were therefore reclassified to Class 10BR along with similarly reboilered Class 10B locomotives.

Their original boilers were fitted with Ramsbottom safety valves, while the Watson Standard boilers were fitted with Pop safety valves. An obvious difference between an original and a Watson Standard reboilered locomotive is usually the rectangular regulator cover just to the rear of the chimney on the reboilered locomotive. In the case of the Class 10BR locomotives, an even more obvious difference was the absence of the Belpaire firebox hump between the cab and boiler on the reboilered engines.

Service
The Class 10-2 saturated locomotives were placed in service to haul passenger trains out of Johannesburg. In service, it was found that their superheated sister locomotives could handle almost 25% more load, so much so that double-heading of passenger trains in the Orange Free State became unnecessary with the Class 10-2 superheated locomotive.

The Class 10-2 saturated locomotives were therefore soon taken off mainline passenger service and put to good use on suburban work. After reboilering and reclassification to Class 10BR, most of the rest of their working lives were spent on the Cape Midland system where they were used on the mainline out of Port Elizabeth.

Two worked as station pilots at Kimberley until 1960, when they joined the rest of the Class which were by then working the suburban between Port Elizabeth and Uitenhage. In later years, they again served on the Reef's suburban routes, while a few were used in the same type of service around Cape Town until they were eventually relegated to shunting work. All but one were scrapped in 1974.

Preservation
Of the Class 10BR ,three survived into preservation. By 2019

References

1650
1650
1650
4-6-2 locomotives
2′C1′ n2 locomotives
NBL locomotives
Cape gauge railway locomotives
Railway locomotives introduced in 1910
1910 in South Africa
2′C1′ h2 locomotives